Payne & Pleasure was Freda Payne's fifth American released album and her first for the ABC/Dunhill label, released in 1974 (ABC owned Payne's previous label, Impulse! Records as well).  The album was produced by  Mckinley Jackson.  It consists of four songs co-written by Lamont Dozier's brother, Reginald ("Reggie"), along with three covers (the Carpenters' hit "I Won't Last a Day Without You," "The Way We Were" [from the film of the same name], and Leon Russell's "A Song for You"). The album was reissued on CD on November 17, 2009. The reissue contains a biographical essay (sourced by interviews with Freda Payne and Lamont Dozier) of Payne's life and career by A. Scott Galloway.

Track listing

Personnel
Produced by: Mckinley Jackson

Musicians on "It's Yours to Have," "Didn't I Tell You," "Run for Your Life"
Guitars: Ray Parker Jr. and Dennis Budimir
Bass: Scott Edwards
Grand piano: Joe Sample
Vibes: Emil Richards
Organ: Huby Heard
WHP Wahguitar: Melvin "Wah-Wah" Ragin
Drums: Kenny "Spike" Rice

Musicians on "A Song for You," "Shadows on the Wall"
Grand piano: Joe Sample
Guitars: Dennis Budimir and Ray Parker
Bass: Scott Edwards
Drums: Ed Greene
Vibes: Emil Richards
Congo: Leslie Bass

Musicians on "I Get Carried Away," "Don't Wanna Be Left Out," "I Won't Last a Day Without You," "The Way We Were"
Bass: Scott Edwards
Drums: Ed Greene
Electric and grand piano: Joe Sample
Harpsichord: Gene Page
Vibes: Emil Richards
Guitars: Melvin "Wah-Wah" Ragin, Ray Parker, Don Peake
Organ: Huby Heard

Solo work by:
Jesse Ehrlich - cello: "A Song for You"
Joe Sample - piano: "Run for Your Life"
Huby Heard - organ: "Don't Wanna Be Left Out"
Ernest Watts - tenor saxophone and flute: "A Song for You"
Background vocals: Shirley Jones, Edna Wright, Marti McCall, Julia Tillman, Myrna Matthews, Clydie King
Arranged and orchestrated by: Lamont Dozier
Recording engineers: Barney Perkins, Reginald Dozier
Mixing engineer: Barney Perkins
Musician contractor: Olivia Page (Beautiful)
Background contractors: Edna Wright, Marti McCall
Copying supervisors: George Annis, Marion Sherrill
Front and back cover photography: Harry Langdon for ABC Records
Inside photos: Harry Langdon, courtesy of Shooting Star Gallery, Los Angeles

CD reissue credits
Reissue supervision: Paul Williams
Project coordination: Howard Tucker, Universal Music Enterprises
Mastered by: Bill Lacey at Digital Sound & Picture, New York
CD design: Chris Eselgroth / FourEyes Studio
Memorabilia and label scans: John Lester, The Reel Music Archives
Thanks to: Harry Weinger, Scott Ravine, Allison Sundberg
Special thanks: Freda Payne and Lamont Dozier

References

1974 albums
ABC Records albums
Freda Payne albums
Albums produced by Lamont Dozier